Jalanatheeswarar Temple (also called Thiruvooral) is a Hindu temple dedicated to the deity Shiva, located in Thakkolam, a village in Vellore district in the South Indian state of Tamil Nadu. Shiva is worshipped as Jalanatheeswarar, and is represented by the lingam. His consort Parvati is depicted as Giriraja Kannikambal. The presiding deity is revered in the 7th century Tamil Saiva canonical work, the Tevaram, written by Tamil saint poets known as the Nayanars and classified as Paadal Petra Sthalam.

The temple complex covers around one acre and entered through a three tiered gopuram, the main gateway. The temple has a number of shrines, with those of Jalantheeswarar and his consort Giriraja Kannikambal, being the most prominent. All the shrines of the temple are enclosed in large concentric rectangular granite walls.

The temple has four daily rituals at various times from 6:00 a.m. to 8:30 p.m., and four yearly festivals on its calendar. The Brahmotsavam festival is celebrated during the month of the Chittirai (April - May) is the most prominent festival.

The original complex is believed to have been built by Pallavas, with later expansion from Cholas, while the present masonry structure was built during the Nayak during the 16th century. In modern times, the temple is maintained and administered by the Hindu Religious and Charitable Endowments Department of the Government of Tamil Nadu.

Legend

As per Hindu legend, Kamdhenu, the divine cow, worshipped Shiva at this place. As per another legend, once the region was inundated with flood waters. It reached Shiva's half and Parvati is believed to have embraced Shiva in fear. It is believed that Shivaa ( or Parvati ) is still seen embracing Shiva at this place. Note that Shivaa and Shiva are different as Shivaa is "aa"kaaraanta and Shiva "a"kaaraanta , the former denotes female Goddess Shivaa or Parvati and the latter refers to male God Shiva . During the first six month of the year, Shiva's image of Linga appears red when crops are fertile during rain, while it turns white during drought. It is also believed to be the place where Yama, the god of death, Saptamartrikas, the seven divine mothers, sages Uthadi and Theerkatha worshipped Shiva at this place.

History

The temple was originally believed to have been built by Pallavas. Most of the Chola temples built during the period of 866 and 1004 CE is associated with certain military events or political campaign. During 940 Parantaka I had frequent trouble from invading Rashtrakutas. Takkolam War, dubbed as the greatest war held in the Tamil region, was fought between Cholas and Rashtrakutas. Parantaka's son Rajaditya was killed in the campaign and Krishna III assumed the name "conqueror of Tanjai and Kanchi". The temple has four inscriptions dating back to 10th and 11th centuries identifying temple women engaged in the temple.

Architecture
The temple has a three-tiered gateway tower and all the shrines of the temple are enclosed in concentric rectangular granite walls. The central shrine houses the image of Jalantheeswarar in the form of Lingam. The image of Lingam is made of sand and sacred ablution is performed only on the Aavudayar. The shrine of Kiriraca Kannikar, the consort of Shiva facing West is located in the Mahamandapam leading to the sanctum. The central shrine is approached through the flagstaff and Mahamandapam, both which are located axial to the gateway. The central shrine has entrance towards South and can be approached circumbulating the shrine. The temple tank has natural spring, which fills through Nandi's shrine. Since water comes out of Nandi's mouth, it called Pokkeswarar temple. As in other Shiva temples in Tamil Nadu, the shrines of Vinayaka, Murugan, Navagraha, Chandikesa and Durga are located around the precinct of the main shrine.

The temple has specimen of Thyagaraja, which is classified as Pre-Rajasimha style of Pallavas. Siva is sported in seated posture holding a rosary and an axe in the back left and right hands. Skanda is seen in standing posture between Siva and Uma. The model in the temple is seen similar to the one at Thyagaraja Temple, Tiruvarur. The temple has Koshta Murthi (Vishnu) in place of Lingothbhava on the wall around the sanctum. There are sculptures of Durga and Koshta Murthi of Brahma is also found seated.

Religious importance

It is one of the shrines of the 275 Paadal Petra Sthalams - Shiva Sthalams glorified in the early medieval Tevaram poems by Tamil Saivite Nayanars Sambandar. Periyapuranam, the treatise about 63 Nayanmars of Shaivites, gives an account of the temple. The Sthalapuranam of the temple, Orriyur Puranam refers to the Nandi of the temple.

Festivals
The temple priests perform the puja (rituals) during festivals and on a daily basis. The temple rituals are performed four times a day; Kalasanthi at 8:00 a.m., Uchikalam at 12:00 a.m., Sayarakshai at 6:00 p.m,  and Arthajamam at 8:00 p.m.. Each ritual comprises four steps: abhisheka (sacred bath), alangaram (decoration), naivethanam (food offering) and deepa aradanai (waving of lamps) for Jalantheeswarar and Giriraja Kannikambal. The Brahmotsavam during the Tamil month of Chittirai (April - May) is the most important festivals of the temple. It follows Chitra Pournami during the month.

References

External links

Hindu temples in Vellore district
Padal Petra Stalam